Sir George John Bell  (29 November 1872 – 5 March 1944) was an Australian soldier and politician. He served as Speaker of the House of Representatives from 1934 to 1940. He represented the Tasmanian seat of Darwin in the House of Representatives from 1919 to 1922 and from 1925 to 1943, representing the Nationalist Party until 1931 and then the United Australia Party (UAP).

Early life
Bell was born in Sale in the state of Victoria, and was the eldest son of George Bell and Catherine Bell, née Hussey. Bell was one of 15 siblings, including William R. Bell. He received his education in the outback of Victoria, and worked on his parents’ farm, before joining the Victorian Mounted Rifles.

Military career

Boer War
Following the outbreak of the Second Boer War, Bell enlisted in Victorian Mounted Infantry as a private. Although travelling back to Australia after the disbandment of the Infantry, he returned to the war, joining the Victorian Mounted Rifles Contingent. He was commissioned as a lieutenant, and was severely injured in a battle in early 1902. He was awarded a Distinguished Service Order for his services in the war.

World War I
After the war, Bell returned to Australia, settling in the state of Tasmania. On the outbreak of the First World War, Bell enlisted for the Australian Imperial Forces, and was dispatched for training in Egypt. He served at Gallipoli and Sinai, and was promoted from the rank of lieutenant to captain, to major and finally, to lieutenant colonel. Given command of the 3rd Light Horse Regiment, Bell's most successful conquest was the capture of Es Salt, and the later successful evacuation of British troops from the stronghold. He was appointed a Companion of the Order of St Michael and St George in April, 1919.

After his return to Australia, Bell married Ellen Rothwell on 5 November 1919.

Politics

Soon after his demobilisation, Bell was proposed as a candidate for federal parliament at the 1919 federal election with the support of the Returned Soldiers and Sailors Imperial League and the Tasmanian Farmers and Stockholders Association. He narrowly defeated the Australian Labor Party (ALP) candidate Joseph Lyons in the seat of Darwin, with a campaign that "appealed to a largely rural electorate by condemning government extravagance and the favouring of 'the crowds of workers in the cities'".

Bell joined the Nationalist Party in federal parliament. He was approached to join the Country Party prior to the 1922 election, but declined and was defeated by Country Party candidate Joshua Whitsitt with the help of ALP preferences. He reclaimed his seat in 1925 and retained it with comfortable majorities at the next six elections, joining the United Australia Party (UAP) upon its creation in 1931.

In 1927, he was appointed as aide-de-camp to the Governor-General of Australia. Elected as chairman of committees in the House of Representatives in 1932, he became Speaker in 1934. Appointed as Knight Commander of the Order of St Michael and St George in 1941, Bell retired from politics in 1943. He died from cardiovascular disease, and was buried in the Burnie Anglican cemetery, following a state funeral.

External links

Footnotes

1872 births
1944 deaths
Australian Companions of the Distinguished Service Order
Australian Knights Commander of the Order of St Michael and St George
Australian politicians awarded knighthoods
Australian military personnel of the Second Boer War
Australian military personnel of World War I
Members of the Australian House of Representatives for Darwin
Nationalist Party of Australia members of the Parliament of Australia
People from Sale, Victoria
Speakers of the Australian House of Representatives
United Australia Party members of the Parliament of Australia
20th-century Australian politicians